Vandita Dhariyal is an Indian butterfly stroke swimmer.

Career
Vandita had participated in various swimming competitions in the 2009 World Aquatics Championships as well as in short course swimming at the 2009 Asian Indoor Games. She won the silver in the 100 metre butterfly swimming at the 2010 South Asian Games.

In 2017, she became the first woman from Gujarat state to swim the English channel.

Personal life
She is from Ahmedabad, Gujarat. She was coached by Kamlesh Nanavati. She graduated from the Lady Shri Ram College for Women, Delhi. She is pursuing Psychology Major from the London School of Economics.

References

Living people
Indian female swimmers
Indian female butterfly swimmers
Sportswomen from Gujarat
Sportspeople from Ahmedabad
Swimmers from Gujarat
Lady Shri Ram College alumni
English Channel swimmers
South Asian Games silver medalists for India
South Asian Games medalists in swimming
21st-century Indian women
21st-century Indian people
Year of birth missing (living people)